Garynahine Estate in Garynahine, a village on the Isle of Lewis, Outer Hebrides was owned by Sir James Matheson, born in Shiness, Lairg, Sutherland, Scotland, from 1844 to 1917. He was the son of Captain Donald Matheson, a Scottish trader in India.

It was then sold to William Lever, 1st Viscount Leverhulme, often referred to as Lord Leverhulme.

Subsequent owners Mr. McGilvray and Mr. Christopher Buxton, had the estate for many years before it was sold to the present owners in 2011 and is currently operated as a resort sporting estate for shooting, fishing and hunting.

References

Bibliography

External links

 Archival Collection TS13 Tasglann nan Eilean Siar
 Garynahine Estate Home Page

Villages in the Isle of Lewis